John Joseph Krimm Jr. (born May 30, 1960) is a former American football defensive back in the National Football League (NFL) who played for the New Orleans Saints. He played college football at University of Notre Dame.

References 

1960 births
Living people
Players of American football from Philadelphia
Notre Dame Fighting Irish football players
New Orleans Saints players